Puccinia purpurea is a plant pathogen that causes rust on sorghum. P. purpurea is native to eastern Australia except Queensland. The pathogen was discovered in 1876 by Cooke. In Australia, it is considered a pest.

See also
 List of Puccinia species

References

External links
 Index Fungorum
 USDA ARS Fungal Database

Fungal plant pathogens and diseases
Sorghum diseases
purpurea
Fungi described in 1876
Taxa named by Mordecai Cubitt Cooke